DWVN may refer to:
 DWVN-FM, an FM radio station broadcasting in Vigan, branded as Magik FM
 DWVN-DTV, a Digital TV radio station broadcasting in Metro Manila